Skidby is a small village and civil parish in Yorkshire Wolds of the East Riding of Yorkshire, England.

The civil parish contains mainly agricultural land, both in the hills of the wolds and the low-lying land. The civil parish also includes the hamlets of Eppleworth and Raywell.

The village is the site of Skidby Windmill, a Grade II* listed building.

Geography

The modern civil parish includes the village of Skidby and the hamlet of Eppleworth, and Raywell. The A164 road forms part of the south-eastern boundary of the parish, on the edge of the Wolds.

Part of the parish is to the east of the village and A164 beyond the Wolds, and north of Cottingham, extending as far as the Hull to Bridlington railway line at its easternmost extent, the land height drops to the east reaching a low of less than  near the railway line. The part of the parish east of the A164 includes a golf course 'Skidby Lakes Golf course' and associated leisure club, as well as a major (400/275 kV AC) electricity substation "Creyke Beck", The remainder of the low-lying area is agricultural.

Most of the parish area is west of the A164, within the wolds: Hessle Golf Club is north of the Eppleworth to Raywell road (Westfield Road), There is a traveller's site at a former chalk quarry near Eppleworth; and a waste composting facility near the former Albion Mill on the route of the former Hull and Barnsley line, expanded to include an in-vessel composting facility in 2015, used to process organic waste from East Riding of Yorkshire Council and Hull City Council. The remainder of the area is in agricultural use.

In the 2011 UK census, Skidby parish had a population of 1,284, a fall from the 2001 UK census figure of 1,369.

Skidby village

Skidby has a single main street, Main Street, running roughly east–west: the eastern end leads to Cottingham, making a crossroads with the former Hessle to Beverley turnpike before a roundabout junction with the A164 road. At the western end of the village Little Weighton Road leads roughly towards Little Weighton; to the south is Riplingham Road, also leading westward, currently (2006) a farm track and footpath.

History

The village's name is thought mean dwelling (-bý) of a person called Skítr, ("Skyti's farm") the words are of Scandinavian origin. An alternative origin meaning 'firewood place' (from skið and by), an origin from the person's name skiði has also been suggested. Other alternatives are 'dirty place', from the old English scite.

The village name 'Skidby' is first recorded by Oswald, Archbishop of York in the 10th century, as Scyteby: the bishop Oscytel was recorded as having acquired it for £20. In the Doomsday Book it is referred to as Schitebi – at the time of the survey it was recorded together with 'Burtone' (near Bishop Burton): the land belonged to the manor of Beverley (in the hands of the church), with over 20 villains and 3 knights.

The forms Skipbie, and Skitby were in use in the 16th century, in the 19th century 'Skitby' was a common form, as was the current form Skidby.

The church of St Michael dates to 1777, with a tower built in 1827. The church was designated a Grade II* listed building in 1968.
Weslyan and Baptist chapels were built in the early 1800s, and a school and teacher's house built in 1849. A cornmill, Skidby Mill was constructed in 1821, raised in the 1870s and listed in 1952.

By the 1850s the village population had reached 306; in 1857 the ecclesiastical parish of Skidby became fully separated from Cottingham and received a resident clergyman.

Around 1885 the Hull and Barnsley Railway was constructed (section closed 1960s), running north-east through the parish: no stations were constructed on the section near Skidby; at the point the railway crossed the Eppleworth valley a five arched brick viaduct was constructed, known locally as 'five arches', or as 'Eppleworth viaduct'.
 North-west of the viaduct the line required an  cutting, known as the Little Weighton Cutting.

In 1972,  of land north of the Eppleworth to Raywell road was acquired for the Hessle Golf Club, which was relocating due to the construction of the Humber Bridge; the eighteen-hole course was opened in 1975.

A traveller's site was established on Westfield Road in a disused chalk pit in the 1980s.

Notes

References

Sources

Map locations

External links

skidby.net Homepage
Beverley 20 description from Walkingenglishman

Villages in the East Riding of Yorkshire
Civil parishes in the East Riding of Yorkshire